TSS St Helier was a passenger vessel built for the Great Western Railway in 1925.

History

TSS St Helier was built by John Brown and Company as one of a pair of vessels, with TSS St Julien for the Weymouth to the Channel Islands service. She was launched on 26 March 1925. Initially built with two funnels, one was a dummy and this was removed in 1928.

In 1939 she was transferred to Fishguard to replace the St Andrew which was already in government service, but she too was requisitioned by November for troop movements from Southampton.

She took part in the Dunkirk evacuation in 1940.  In all she made one trip to Calais and seven to Dunkirk rescuing 1,500 refugees and 10,200 allied soldiers. Following which the captain and first and second officers were awarded the Distinguished Service Cross, while the quartermaster received the Distinguished Service Medal.

After Dunkirk she saw government service between Gourock and the Isle of Man, transporting prisoners-of-war to camps on the island.

She was then taken over by the Royal Navy as HMS St Helier and moved to Dartmouth to support Motor Torpedo Boats before being converted to an assault ship LSI(H) for the D-Day landings.

She then returned to Weymouth for further railway service which lasted until the end of 1960. On 19 December 1960 she arrived in Antwerp for breaking up by Jos de Smedt.

References

1925 ships
Passenger ships of the United Kingdom
Steamships of the United Kingdom
Ships built on the River Clyde
Ships of the Great Western Railway